Hegelochus or Hegelochos may refer to:

 Hegelochus of Macedon (4th century BCE), a Macedonian general and admiral of Alexander the Great
 Hegelochus (actor) (5th century BCE), Athenian tragic actor whose pronunciation was mocked by Sannyrion and other poets
 Hegelochus (Macedonian general) (4th century BC), see Apollonides of Chios